The 2015 Autobacs Super GT Series was the twenty-third season of the Japan Automobile Federation Super GT Championship including the All Japan Grand Touring Car Championship (JGTC) era, and the eleventh season under the name Super GT. It marked the thirty-third season overall of a Japanese professional sportscar championship dating back to the All Japan Sports Prototype Championship.  The season began on April 5 and ended on November 15, after 8 races.

Schedule
A provisional calendar was released on August 8, 2014. An updated calendar was released on January 19, 2015, which saw the Autopolis race move from May to November, the Chang race move from October to June and SUGO from July to September.

Drivers and teams

GT500

GT300

Driver changes

Team transfers
 With the Weider Honda Racing Team leaving Super GT, Naoki Yamamoto moved to Team Kunimitsu to partner Takuya Izawa.
 Lucas Ordonez moves from NDDP Racing to drive for Kondo Racing for the first three rounds.  Michael Krumm will replace him to drive the remaining rounds.  
 Daisuke Ito will move from the KeePer TOM'S team to the Petronas TOM'S team.
 Hiroaki Ishiura swapped seats with Kohei Hirate at the Zent Cerumo Team, with Hirate now driving for SARD.  
 With Team Mugen leaving Super GT, Tomoki Nojiri will replace Vitantonio Liuzzi at the ARTA GT500 team.  Former partner Yuhki Nakayama will drive for the new UPGARAGE with BANDOH team.  
 Porsche Team KTR overhauled their driver line-up, recruiting Rebellion Racing driver Alexandre Imperatori and All-Japan Formula Three Championship driver Kenta Yamashita.
 Hideki Yamauchi moved from Gainer to R&D Sport, replacing Kota Sasaki.
 Morio Nitta, who drove for apr in the Toyota Prius, moved to LM Corsa to drive the #51 BMW Z4 GT3.

Joining Super GT
 Oliver Turvey joined Drago Modulo Honda Racing, partnering Takashi Kogure.
 Ryo Hirakawa, who previously drove for the Petronas TOM'S team, joined the KeePer TOM'S team.
 Former F1 driver Heikki Kovalainen joined the SARD team, replacing Oliver Jarvis.
 Shigekazu Wakisaka, Juichi Wakisaka's older brother, will join the LM Corsa team, driving the #51 JMS BMW Z4 GT3.
 Asian Le Mans Series driver Takamitsu Matsui will drive for the new VivaC team Tsuchiya
 Former Sauber F1 test driver Marko Asmer will partner Yuhki Nakayama in the UPGARAGE with BANDOH team.
 All-Japan Formula Three Championship driver Mitsunori Takaboshi will drive for NDDP Racing with Kazuki Hoshino in the Nissan GTR GT3.

Leaving Super GT

 Frederic Makowiecki will not return to drive this season, following Weider Honda Racing's withdrawal.
 Oliver Jarvis left the series to drive for Audi Sport Team Joest in the 2015 World Endurance Championship.
 ARTA driver Vitantonio Liuzzi will be replaced by former Mugen driver Tomoki Nojiri after a disappointing season last year.
 After years of being with Real Racing, Toshihiro Kaneishi will not drive for this season, being replaced by former Team Kunimitsu driver Hideki Mutoh.
 Kazuki Nakajima, like Oliver Jarvis, will not return to focus on his LMP1 drive in the 2015 World Endurance Championship.

Team changes

GT500

Weider Honda Racing will leave the Super GT series, being replaced by the Drago Modulo Honda Racing Team.  They will utilize Bridgestone tyres.

GT300
 Team Taisan and Team Mugen withdrew from the series.
 Cars Tokai Dream28 will switch to race a Lotus Evora mother chassis, replacing their McLaren MP4-12C GT3 from 2014 and 2013.  
 Gainer replaced their #10 Mercedes-Benz SLS AMG GT3 car with a Nissan GTR GT3, following Rn-SPORTS' split from the team.  
 Pacific Racing Team will replace their Porsche 911 GT3R  with a McLaren MP4-12C GT3.
 LM Corsa will expand to two cars, with their purchase of the new Lexus RCF GT3.
 Team Mach will switch from a Nissan GTR GT3 to a Toyota 86 mother chassis.  New teams VivaC team Tsuchiya and Team UPGARAGE with BANDOH will also field a Toyota 86 mother chassis.  
 Goodsmile Racing will replace their BMW Z4 GT3 with a Mercedes-Benz SLS AMG GT3.
 Audi Team Racing Tech will join the series with an Audi R8 LMS ultra.
 Direction Racing replaced their Porsche 911 GT3R with a Ferrari 458 Italia GT3.
 Dijon Racing would field a second Nissan GTR GT3, car #47, for only rounds 4 and 8.
 R&D Sport will switch to Dunlop tyres. 
 Arnage Racing will replace their Aston Martin V12 Vantage GT3 with a Mercedes-Benz SLS AMG GT3.

Mid-season changes
 From round 6 and up, Team UPGARAGE with BANDOH will change their racing number from 18 to 20.
 Audi Team Racing Tech left the series after the Suzuka round due to a severe accident.  They will return in 2016 with the upgraded Audi R8 LMS ultra.

Calendar

Championship standings
Scoring system

Drivers' championships

GT500

GT300

References

External links
 

2015
Super GT